Alphen-Chaam is a municipality in the southern Netherlands.

Population centres 
Towns:
 Alphen (4,000)
 Chaam (3,810)
 Galder (1,190)

Hamlets (the population data of these hamlets is included in the population data of the towns near which they are located):

Topography

Topographic map of the municipality of Alphen-Chaam, Sept. 2014.

Notable people 
 Ruud de Moor (born 1928 in Chaam – 2001) a Dutch professor of sociology
 Piet A. Verheyen (born 1931 in Alphen) a Dutch economist and academic
 Natasha den Ouden (born 1973 in Galder) a Dutch cyclist
 Jelle Klaasen (born 1984 in Alphen) a Dutch professional darts player, the youngest winner of the World Darts Championship at age 21

Gallery

References

External links 

 

 
Municipalities of North Brabant
Municipalities of the Netherlands established in 1997